Charles-Victor Guilloux (1866–1946) was a French symbolist artist.

Biography
Guilloux was born in Paris in 1866 and died in  Lormes, Nièvre, in 1946.

An employee of the Bibliothèque Nationale in Paris, Guilloux was a self-taught artist who critics like  Albert Aurier, Félix Fénéon, and  Rémy de Gourmont liken to the time of the Symbolist movement. From 1891, his works were successfully received at the exhibitions of the  Société des artistes indépendants, and then at the "Impressionists and Symbolists" exhibitions at the gallery of Le Barc de Boutteville.

Very soon, the titles of his paintings appear more elliptical, sometimes tinged with musical connotations (Scherzo Moon, 1894, location unknown), while the origin of his motifs becomes less and less identifiable.

This structuring of space and the distribution of forms and colors on which André Mellerio (1862–1943) commented in his idealist movement in painting (1896), are found in many works painted by Guilloux: Moonrise over a Channel (Mills, Anne de Beaujeu Museum) or Landscape at Dusk (Beauvais, Musée de l'Oise département).

He exhibited at the Salon de la Société nationale des Beaux-Arts in 1905, and at the Salon des Indépendants  between 1911 and  1914. In 2007, the Musée d'Orsay bought his painting Crépuscule (Twilight)

References

French Symbolist painters
19th-century French painters
French male painters
20th-century French painters
20th-century French male artists
1866 births
1946 deaths
19th-century French male artists